My Life with Dalí is an autobiography by French singer Amanda Lear, first released in 1984, which tells about her relationship with Spanish surrealist painter Salvador Dalí. The book, which had Dalí's full approval, gave detailed insights into the lives of both the artist and his muse.

Background
The book was originally published in French in 1984 as Le Dalí d'Amanda. It has since been translated into no less than six languages and released in Europe, Asia and the USA. The first English language edition was released by Virgin Books as My Life with Dalí in the UK in 1985. In 2004, an updated and expanded edition was released in France, entitled Mon Dalí. The book was dedicated to "Gala, the patient, loving wife".

The story of the book starts in London in autumn 1965 and introduces Lear as a fine art student, living in Chelsea's Sloane Avenue. Her first meeting with Dalí took place around that time in Le Castel, a famous Parisian restaurant and nightclub, and gave the beginning to an over-15-year-long friendship. Lear has since been the painter's muse and closest friend, although, as she herself repeatedly marked, their relationship never was intimate. In addition, Lear describes also her relations with the likes of Brian Jones, Tara Browne and David Bowie, and mentions Anita Pallenberg, Keith Richards, Pablo Picasso, Brigitte Bardot and other notable personalities of the cultural world of the 1960s and 1970s.

According to the biography, Lear accompanied Dalí and his wife on trips to Barcelona, Madrid, New York and Paris, over a period of some fifteen years. She also spent every summer with Dalí at his home at Port Lligat, near Cadaqués in Catalonia. Lear posed for some of Dalí's works, took part in several of his film projects and could be seen by his side during press conferences and meetings with the media. These media events, characteristically for the age of flower power and this stage of Dalí's life, often turned into happenings as spectacular as the art itself, frequently with Lear as the central figure. With the Dalís, Lear also regularly socialised with celebrities and European royalty such as Prince Rainier and Princess Grace of Monaco. Dalí served as a mentor to Lear, their travels allowing her to  discover the great museums of Europe, Parisian salons and restaurants, New York bohemia and his homeland, Spain, especially the Catalan culture. In return, she introduced him to the younger generation of the counterculture in art, fashion, photography and music in London. 

Plans have been made to produce a biographical film based on the content of the book. Jeremy Irons was considered to play the part of Dalí while Claudia Schiffer was a candidate for the role of Amanda. As Lear herself revealed in a 2001 interview, Schiffer, having read the book, viciously said to her upon their meeting: "Amanda, I really like your book. Who wrote it for you?" Which made Lear reply with irony: "I'm glad you liked it. Who read it to you?". The film was never produced.

Release history

References

1984 non-fiction books
French autobiographies
Salvador Dalí
Virgin Books books